Takehiro (written: , , , , , , , , , , ,  or ) is a masculine Japanese given name. Notable people with the name include:

, Japanese baseball player
, Japanese footballer
, Japanese actor
Takehiro Honda (born 1945), Japanese jazz pianist
, Japanese writer
, Japanese baseball player
, Japanese gymnast
, Japanese footballer
, Japanese speed skater
Takehiro Koyama, Japanese voice actor
, Japanese chef
 Takehiro Mamiya (born 1989), Japanese music producer, better known as Yuyoyuppe
, Japanese voice actor
, Japanese shogi player
, Japanese footballer
, Japanese freestyle skier
, Japanese racewalker
, Japanese Nordic combined skier
, Japanese table tennis player
, Japanese motorcycle racer

See also
8737 Takehiro, a main-belt minor planet

Japanese masculine given names